Mark of the Frog is a 1928 American drama 10-chapter film serial directed by Arch Heath and written by Edgar Wallace. The film is now considered to be lost.

Plot
In search of missing treasure, a crime ring headed by the hooded "Frog" terrorizes New York.

Cast
 Donald Reed
 Margaret Morris
 George Harcourt
 Gus De Weil
 Frank Lackteen
 Charles Anthony Hughes (as Tony Hughes)
 Frank B. Miller
 Helen Greene
 Ed Roseman
 Sidney Paxton
 Morgan Jones

Chapter titles
 The Gas Attack
 Decoyed
 The Jail Delivery
 Triple Vengeance
 The Enemy Within
 Cross Fire
 Framed
 A Life At Stake
 A Race With Death
 Paying The Penalty

See also
 List of film serials
 List of film serials by studio
 The Frog (1937)
 The Return of the Frog (1938)
 Der Frosch mit der Maske (1959)

References

External links

1928 films
1928 drama films
Silent American drama films
American silent serial films
American black-and-white films
Films with screenplays by Edgar Wallace
Lost American films
1928 lost films
Lost drama films
Films directed by Arch Heath
1920s American films